Table Rock is a village in Pawnee County, Nebraska, United States. The population was 236 at the 2020 census.

History
Table Rock was platted in 1855. It was named from a large rock formation nearby on the Nemaha River which has since been destroyed. It failed to prosper until the Atchison and Nebraska Railroad was built through town in about 1882.

Geography
Table Rock is located at  (40.178607, -96.093525).

Demographics

2010 census
As of the census of 2010, there were 269 people, 133 households, and 70 families residing in the village. The racial makeup of the village was 97.8% White, 1.5% African American, and 0.7% from two or more races. Hispanic or Latino of any race were 1.9% of the population.

There were 133 households, of which 27.1% had children under the age of 18 living with them, 40.6% were married couples living together, 7.5% had a female householder with no husband present, 4.5% had a male householder with no wife present, and 47.4% were non-families. 46.6% of all households were made up of individuals, and 27.1% had someone living alone who was 65 years of age or older. The average household size was 2.02 and the average family size was 2.83.

The median age in the village was 46.3 years. 23.4% of residents were under the age of 18; 4% were between the ages of 18 and 24; 20.8% were from 25 to 44; 27.1% were from 45 to 64; and 24.5% were 65 years of age or older. The gender makeup of the village was 49.1% male and 50.9% female.

2000 census
As of the census of 2000, there were 264 people, 144 households, and 68 families residing in the village. The population density was 451.2 people per square mile (172.8/km). There were 178 housing units at an average density of 304.2 per square mile (116.5/km). The racial makeup of the village was 99.62% White and 0.38% Asian. Hispanic or Latino of any race were 1.52% of the population.

There were 144 households, out of which 15.3% had children under the age of 18 living with them, 38.9% were married couples living together, 5.6% had a female householder with no husband present, and 52.1% were non-families. 46.5% of all households were made up of individuals, and 25.7% had someone living alone who was 65 years of age or older. The average household size was 1.83 and the average family size was 2.58.

In the village, the population was spread out, with 16.3% under the age of 18, 3.8% from 18 to 24, 19.7% from 25 to 44, 26.9% from 45 to 64, and 33.3% who were 65 years of age or older. The median age was 54 years. For every 100 females, there were 95.6 males. For every 100 females age 18 and over, there were 97.3 males.

As of 2000 the median income for a household in the village was $24,545, and the median income for a family was $33,000. Males had a median income of $28,250 versus $16,500 for females. The per capita income for the village was $18,384. About 11.8% of families and 11.1% of the population were below the poverty line, including 7.7% of those under the age of eighteen and 16.5% of those 65 or over.

Education
Its school district is Humboldt Table Rock Steinauer Public Schools.

Table Rock is part of a school district including Steinauer, Humboldt, Dawson, Stella, and Shubert.

Notable people
 William R. (Link) Lyman (1898–1972), football player in Pro Football Hall of Fame
 Theodore Pepoon (1836–1915), legislator and publisher
 Rufus A. Lyman (1875–1957), leader in US pharmacy education during the first half of the 20th century; is the only person to be the founding dean of colleges of pharmacy at two state universities (Nebraska and Arizona).
 Floyd Vrtiska (1926–2020), farmer and politician

References

Villages in Pawnee County, Nebraska
Villages in Nebraska